Klarenbeek is a railway station, located in Klarenbeek, Netherlands. The station opened on 1 June 1882 and is on the Amsterdam–Zutphen railway (Oosterspoorweg). The station is actually 2 km north-east of Klarenbeek.  The station was originally only built because the line between Apeldoorn and Zutphen was single track, a passing point was needed, this was here.  Until December 2006, the station had just 1 platform and one train each way per hour stopped at the station, allowing the other to pass.  In December 2006, when 2 more new stations were built on the line, the station received 2 platforms. The train services are operated by Arriva.

Tourism

The station is the beginning point for many walks in the area, many people start their journey at the station to see the famous country-side. The Dutch Railways offers many walks in this area via their magazine which is sent to all their customers around The Netherlands.

Train service
The following services call at Klarenbeek:
2x per hour local services (stoptrein) Apeldoorn – Zutphen

Bus service
508 Klarenbeek Station – Klarenbeek – Klein Amsterdam – Empe – Voorst-Empe Station operates 1x per hour (Monday to Saturday) and is operated by Syntus.

External links
NS website 
Dutch Public Transport journey planner 

Railway stations opened in 1882
Railway stations in Gelderland
Railway stations on the Apeldoorn - Zutphen railway line
Voorst
1882 establishments in the Netherlands
Railway stations in the Netherlands opened in the 19th century